The River Hawen is the main stream that flows through Llangrannog, Ceredigion, Wales into Cardigan Bay.
It falls as a waterfall near the centre of the village, then flows to the beach through a v-shaped valley. Shortly after passing the waterfall, it is joined by the smaller Nant Ddu from the south.

References

Hawen